Ahmed El Keiy is a French/Egyptian journalist and media expert.

Life
Ahmed El Keiy was born in Cairo and arrived in France at the age of 5 with his parents after his father was appointed as a senior international civil servant at UNESCO. He passed the International Baccalauréat at the École Jeannine Manuel (school). He studied political science and law and graduated from Panthéon-Assas University - Master and higher level degree in International Law ("diplôme de troisième cycle") in 1993    before joining an international law firm.

He is passionate about theatre and cinema.   In 1995 he received an ADAMI "young talent" award at the Cannes International Film Festival.   He took the main role in "La Corde" ("The Rope"), a short film that won the jury prize at film festivals in Bastia and, outside France, Larissa.   He also appeared as an actor in "Imentet, un passage par l'Egypte" in a production at the Paris Odéon Theatre.   He has toured with theatre companies inside and outside France, and taken parts in plays by Chekhov, Goldoni, Beckett, Crommelynck and others.

Ahmed EL KEIY began writing for various newspapers and magazines, Le Nouvel Observateur (Paris) and Al-Ahram (Cairo).   Fluent in French, English and Arabic, he regularly appears as an expert commentator on anglophone television news programmes, BBC and CNN, particularly during the riots that took place in the French suburban areas in 2005.
Radio and TV journalist, he first appeared on France Televisions in 2005. He produced and presented the daily political and social talk show "Toutes les France" from 2007 until 2016.   The programme, which aims at reflecting French diversity, covers and analyses the main national and international issues. During 2011/12 TV season , with more resources and larger audience, « Toutes Les France » was converted from a daily to a weekly format and filmed outdoors. Ahmed El Keiy has also created and presented between 2002 and 2009 the main prime time news debate talk show « Le Forum-debat » on Beur FM radio of which he became chief editor and head of news in 2005. 

He was appointed in 2011 Deputy Director of the Arab language content of the Audiovisuel Extérieur de la France  ( France 24 news channel and International French Radio) and was also the Head of News of the French , English and Arab speaking channels of France 24. Since 2015, Ahmed El Keiy is a senior consultant in the fields of political and strategic communication.  He worked as a senior media expert and communication advisor for several national and international institutions such as the Egyptian Presidency, and for French and foreign private companies. Part of his activity is also devoted to media education and training in several countries.

References

6.https://www.telerama.fr/television/informer-les-jeunes-apres-charlie-sur-france-o,121900.php

7.https://www.telerama.fr/television/19-raisons-de-regarder-france-o,125262.php

8.https://amp.france24.com/fr/aef-nominations-france24-rfi-mcd-redaction

9.https://amp.france24.com/fr/france24-alnahar-presidentielle-egyptienne

10.https://www.telerama.fr/television/cherchez-la-femme,35608.php

11.https://www.telerama.fr/television/tele-ne-rime-toujours-pas-avec-diversite,42620.php

12.http://news.bbc.co.uk/2/hi/europe/7826463.stm

13.https://www.reuters.com/article/uk-france-islam-radio-idUKL049580820071010

14.https://amp.france24.com/fr/20121120-lentretien-mohamed-ould-abdel-aziz-president-mauritanien

15.https://www.telesphere.fr/?s=Ahmed+el+KEIY

16.https://www.lapresse.ca/international/europe/201201/13/01-4485412-le-qatar-investit-dans-les-banlieues-francaises.php

17.https://www.lemonde.fr/import/article/2005/08/06/beur-fm-laique-d-abord_678232_3544.html

18.https://www.lemonde.fr/societe/article/2010/06/05/washington-a-la-conquete-du-9-3_1368266_3224.html

19.https://teleobs.nouvelobs.com/la-selection-teleobs/20150207.OBS1956/quelle-laicite-aujourd-hui.amp

20.https://www.13or-du-hiphop.fr/2015/02/06/medine-parle-de-laicite-sur-france-o/amp/

21.https://www.lemonde.fr/societe/article/2006/06/21/le-front-national-drague-la-communaute-maghrebine-sur-beur-fm_786273_3224.html

22.https://www.alborsaanews.com/2013/05/25/420853

23.https://www.liberation.fr/evenement/2004/09/02/on-n-a-rien-a-voir-avec-ces-gens-la_491020/?outputType=amp

24.http://edition.cnn.com/TRANSCRIPTS/0511/12/i_c.01.html

25.https://www.bbc.co.uk/worldservice/programmes/outlook/news/story/2007/04/printable/070416_parisimmigrants_france.shtml

Living people
Journalists from Paris
French television journalists
Paris 2 Panthéon-Assas University alumni
French male journalists
Year of birth missing (living people)